Ischnophanes canariella is a moth of the family Coleophoridae. It is found on the Canary Islands (Tenerife).

References

 , 1984: Contributions à la connaissance des Coleophoridae XXXVII, Ischnophanes canariella n. sp. Nota Lepidopterologica 7 (2): 101–106.

Coleophoridae
Moths described in 1984